CHAIN may refer to:
 CHAIN (industry standard), an acronym for Ceced Home Appliances Interoperating Network, a standard for a multi-brands home network of interactive household appliances.
 Controlled and Harmonised Aeronautical Information Network, a concept of EUROCONTROL to improve the quality of aeronautical data.
 Canadian High Arctic Ionospheric Network, an array of ground-based radio instruments

See also
 Chain (disambiguation)